Drumsna ( which translates as the ridge of the swimming place) is a village in County Leitrim, Ireland. It is situated 6 km east of Carrick-on-Shannon on the River Shannon and is located off the N4 National primary route which links Dublin and Sligo. The harbour dates to 1817 and was a hive of commercial waterway activity until the more northern navigation canal to Carrick-on-Shannon was opened in 1850. Today, the waterway is busy with anglers and tourist pursuits in the summer months.

History
One ancient way of crossing a river was swimming - "ag Snámh" in Irish.

The oldest known name for Drumsna is "Snamh-Rathainn", which appears in the Irish Annals at 1148AD. It is mentioned again at 1261AD when the "fortress" of Hugh O’Conor, king of Connacht, at Snamh-in-redaigh was burned. John O'Donovan authoritatively states its "probably Drumsna, on the Shannon, on the borders of Leitrim and Roscommon”.

In 1552AD Ferdorcha MagRaghnaill of Muintir Eolais was the Irish chieftain over Drumsna.

In the late 19th century, Drumsna was the main trading town in Leitrim with its own jail and courthouse. It was the resting place for horse-drawn carriages and the harbour was a thriving delivery port. In 1850, the construction of the Jamestown Canal led to a change of the Shannon navigation which altered the status of Drumsna.

Throughout at least the 19th and 20th centuries, a number of annual fairs were held at Drumsna on- May 20, June 22, August 25, October 7, and December 13. There was a Chalybeate Spa near the village in the 19th century. In 1925, Drumsna village comprised 35 houses, 5 being licensed to sell alcohol.

Ashfort House, near Drumsna, was originally the home of the Caulfield family. It was purchased by the Waldrons of Cartron in 1744. It was here in January 1848 that Hubert Kelly Waldron JP was murdered in a non-political incident when the local coroner attempted to serve him with a writ.

Until 1996 the main N4 Dublin to Sligo road passed through the village which was then bypassed.

Natural history

In the 19th century the skull of a small ancient Irish elk was found in the Shannon, at Drumsna Bridge.

Amenities and facilities

Angling
The unpolluted lakes and rivers in the Drumsna area support a huge population of wild fish, and it is a base for angling. Coarse fish species include bream, roach, rudd, hybrids, tench, pike, perch and eels.
The Shannon flows through the village and there are several good fishing lakes close by. The Shannon has bream, rudd, roach, tench, perch and pike. Lough Aduff just outside the village is home to bream, roach and tench.

Drumsna Roman Catholic Church
Built in 1845 and part-financed from the proceeds of a trip to Rome by the then Parish Priest, Father George Geraghty, the building has one of the largest church bells in the country. The church also contains a statue to the Virgin Mary which was the only surviving item from Belmount House when it was destroyed by fire.

Transport
Drumsna railway station opened on 1 September 1863, and finally closed on 17 June 1963.

Drumnsa lies beside the River Shannon with its own jetty. It is a common stopping point for boats though navigation for cruisers is not possible upstream of here. Boats are required to use the Albert Lock and Jamestown Canal which links to the Shannon upstream of Jamestown, County Leitrim.

List of Townlands around Drumsna

Effrinagh
Mountcampbell
Foxborough
Lavagh
Lisduff
Dristernan
Gortconellan
Lislea
Drumnadober
Charlestown
Gowel
Liscallyroan

People
Admiral Sir Josias Rowley, 1st Bt., GCB, GCMG, RN (1765–1842).
Rear Admiral Samuel Campbell Rowley (1774 - 1846). Represented the constituency of Kinsale in the last Irish Parliament before the union with Great Britain and was subsequently elected to the Westminster Parliament, where he served until 1806. Younger brother of Josias Rowley.
The writer Anthony Trollope (24 April 1815 – 6 December 1882), lived in the village for a period during the 1840s, where he wrote The Macdermots of Ballycloran. Anthony Trollope was remembered in the village with the launch of the Historic Trollope Trail by President Mary McAleese in September 2008.
Robert Strawbridge (1732–1781), one of the pioneers of Methodism in the United States, was born in Gortconnellan, Drumsna. The Wesleyan historical society erected a memorial to Robert Strawbride in Drumsna in 1992.
Thomas Heazle Parke, African explorer and surgeon (1857–1893), was born in Clogher House, Drumsna, Co Roscommon.

See also
 List of towns and villages in Ireland

References and notes

Notes

References

Sources

  Archival records, Scanned records}}
 

Towns and villages in County Leitrim
Populated places on the River Shannon
Places of Conmaicne Maigh Nissi